Subramaniam Sivapalan was a Ceylon Tamil politician and Member of Parliament.

Early life
Sivapalan was born around 1890. He was the son of M. Subramaniam, a Secretary of the District Court in Trincomalee in eastern British Ceylon. He was educated at the Wesleyan Mission English School, Trincomalee, St. Patrick's College, Jaffna and Wesley College, Colombo. He joined the Government Clerical Service.

Sivapalan was appointed Vanniya (chief headman) of Kaddukulam Pattu Division in 1935. Later he was appointed Vanniya of Thampalakamam Division.

Sivapalan married Bagavathy, daughter of Somasundaram. They had five sons (Sivarajan, Sundararajan, Sriskantharajah, Varatharajan and Ganeshan) and one daughter (Vimaladevi).

Political career
Sivapalan was the All Ceylon Tamil Congress's candidate for Trincomalee at the 1947 parliamentary election. He won the election and entered Parliament. He stood for re-election at the 1952 parliamentary election but was defeated by the Illankai Tamil Arasu Kachchi candidate.

References
 

1960 deaths
All Ceylon Tamil Congress politicians
Alumni of St. Patrick's College, Jaffna
Alumni of Wesley College, Colombo
Members of the 1st Parliament of Ceylon
Sri Lankan Tamil civil servants
Sri Lankan Tamil politicians
Year of birth missing